The Mănești-Vlădeni gas field natural gas field in Mănești near Vlădeni in Dâmbovița County. It was discovered in 1943 and developed by Petrom. It began production in 1945 and produces natural gas and condensates. The total proven reserves of the Mănești-Vlădeni gas field are around 52 billion cubic feet (1.5 km³), and production is slated to be around 4.6 million cubic feet/day (0.13×105m³) in 2008.

References

Natural gas fields in Romania